Aquaplaning is a surface water sport which involves riding a board (aquaplane) over the surface of a body of water towed behind a motorboat.

History

Developed in the early 20th century, aquaplaning became popular for several decades but was superseded by the development of similar sports such as water skiing from the 1920s and kneeboarding from the 1950s. 

A picture postcard from Long Beach, California (published c1907-1914) has a crude drawing of aquaplaning.  
 
The Wisconsin Rapids Newspaper the Wood County reporter published a picture of woman aquaplaning on September 4, 1919. The article talks about how the board was developed from the Hawaiian Islanders' surfboards and that by the time of publication thousands were participating in the sport.

From 1935 a 44-mile aquaplane race held between Santa Catalina Island and Hermosa Beach, California endorsed by the American Power Boat Association attracted competitors from around the world.

Gallery

See also

 Wakeboarding
 Skurfing (sport)

Bibliography
Notes

References 

 

Boardsports
Water sports